Turhan Yıldız (born 1940) is a Turkish former footballer. He competed in the men's tournament at the 1960 Summer Olympics.

References

External links
 

1940 births
Living people
Turkish footballers
Olympic footballers of Turkey
Footballers at the 1960 Summer Olympics
Association football forwards
Footballers from İzmir